Ronald Gabriel Palillo (April 2, 1949 – August 14, 2012) was an American actor and teacher. He was best known for his role as the endearingly dim-witted character Arnold Horshack on the ABC sitcom Welcome Back, Kotter (1975–1979).

Early life and education
Ronald Gabriel Paolillo was born in New Haven, Connecticut, to Italian-Americans Gabriel and Carmel Paolillo, and raised in nearby Cheshire. He graduated from Cheshire High School and the University of Connecticut at Storrs, where he would teach in the 1990s. He attended Fairfield University while pursuing a postgraduate degree. He adopted the last name Palillo for his acting career.

Career

In 1975, Palillo was cast as Arnold Horshack, one of the misfit "sweathogs" in the high school sitcom Welcome Back, Kotter, whose antics made him one of the standout characters of the series. In the last season of the series, a backdoor pilot episode for a spin-off series featuring Horshack was produced, but the series was not developed.

Following Kotter, Palillo appeared in leading and supporting roles in various television series and films. He voiced characters on such animated series as Laverne & Shirley in the Army, Darkwing Duck, and Rubik, the Amazing Cube, in which he played the lead character. In 1996, Palillo played himself in several episodes of the television sitcom Ellen, playing the love interest of Ellen's friend Audrey. Palillo also spent a year on the daytime show One Life to Live and also acted in Friday the 13th Part VI: Jason Lives (1986), and the lead in The Curse of Micah Rood.

He returned to New York in 1991, and played such stage roles as Mozart in Amadeus and regionally as George in Who's Afraid of Virginia Woolf?, Arthur in Camelot and Nathan Detroit in Guys and Dolls. He appeared on Broadway in 2008 in Broadway Backwards 4, a charity event benefiting Broadway Cares/Equity Fights AIDS and The Lesbian, Gay, Bisexual & Transgender Community Center. Among his other New York City credits were a one-person show in 2000 where he portrayed Nazi criminal Adolf Eichmann in The Diary of Adolf Eichmann off-Broadway. Palillo, in a newspaper interview in 1997, said he lamented his role as Horshack as he was permanently typecast, which he believed had damaged his career.

As a director, Palillo directed successful productions of the musical Three Guys Naked From The Waist Down in Los Angeles, A Closer Walk with Patsy Cline, and a new edition of Phantom Of The Opera at the Cuillo Center for the Arts in West Palm Beach, Florida. In 2007, he introduced a clothing line specializing in limited-edition T-shirts produced by Rotter and Friends. Palillo was also an artist, providing artwork for two children's books: The Red Wings of Christmas and A Gift for the Contessa. 

In 2005, his first full-length play, The Lost Boy, the true story of Peter Pan author J. M. Barrie, premiered at the Helen Hayes Theatre in Nyack, New York, and later played at the Queens Theatre in the Park in Queens, New York, and at El Dorado Springs High School in El Dorado Springs, Missouri.

He taught freshman drama at G-Star School of the Arts for Motion Pictures and Broadcasting in Palm Springs, Florida.

Personal life and death
Palillo and his partner of 41 years, Joseph Gramm, lived in Palm Beach Gardens, Florida. On August 14, 2012, Palillo suffered a heart attack at his home and was taken by ambulance to a nearby hospital, where he was pronounced dead on arrival. He died seven months after co-star Robert Hegyes, who also died from a heart attack.

Palillo's funeral service was held in Palm Beach Gardens on August 22, 2012. He is buried at St. Lawrence Cemetery in West Haven, Connecticut. A memorial tribute, directed by Lawrence Leritz and hosted by Tyne Daly, was held to honor and celebrate Palillo's life and career at New York City's Triad Theatre on October 3, 2012.

Filmography

References

External links
 
 
 Corporate Speakers site for Ron Palillo
 
 

1949 births
2012 deaths
20th-century American male actors
20th-century American artists
21st-century American artists
21st-century American dramatists and playwrights
American male film actors
American writers of Italian descent
American male stage actors
American male television actors
American male voice actors
Artists from Connecticut
American children's book illustrators
American gay actors
American gay writers
People from Cheshire, Connecticut
University of Connecticut alumni
Fairfield University alumni
Writers from Connecticut
American LGBT dramatists and playwrights
LGBT people from Connecticut
LGBT people from Florida
20th-century American dramatists and playwrights
American male dramatists and playwrights
People from Palm Beach Gardens, Florida
20th-century American male writers
21st-century American male writers
Male actors from New Haven, Connecticut
Cheshire High School alumni